Blood on Ice is the ninth studio album by Swedish extreme metal band Bathory. It was released on 27 May 1996, through Black Mark Production. It is a concept album.

Background 
The master tapes were recorded in 1989, but the album was not immediately released, both because the album was never properly finished, and because founder and songwriter Quorthon was worried that it presented too drastic a departure from the band's previous black metal sound. It was eventually released, after remastering and re-editing on more advanced studio equipment, in 1996, partly through fan pressure resulting from his mentioning of the project in an interview. Quorthon expands on this, as well as more specific matters about the recording of Blood on Ice and many of the other early Bathory albums in his liner notes for this release. The album's plot follows ideas and formats typical of the sagas, but was written by Quorthon himself. The album cover is drawn by Kristian Wåhlin.

Storyline 
The anonymous central character, aged ten when the tale begins, is the sole survivor of a raid by twenty black-clad horsemen bearing the banner of the 'twin-headed Beast' against his village. All the men are slain, and the women and children carried off to the far North, whilst the central character survives by hiding in a tree. He spends fifteen years alone in the wilderness, where he grows strong and learns the ways of the forest, the memories of the atrocities he has witnessed galvanising him. Then, one day, he meets a one-eyed old man (most probably Odin, although the tale always refers to him merely as 'One-Eyed Old Man') who tells him that he has foreseen his coming for a thousand years, and that he has been chosen as a champion of the Gods to fight their battle in the shadows beyond his world. To this end he will be granted a number of mighty artifacts and abilities, and be trained for a hundred days and nights by the old man. The first of these artifacts is a mighty sword (probably Tyrfing), forged in the dawn of the world, and the second given in a song is a mighty, eight-legged stallion ridden by 'his father's God' (Sleipnir, Odin's steed).

He will also be guided by two ravens (Huginn and Muninn), and is granted a number of supernatural powers: first, the woodwoman, a witch, takes his heart, for which price he can withstand any cut or slit. Then he travels to the bottomless lake in which all the knowledge of the worlds, old and new, is stored. The old man cast his left eye into the lake in order to give him his powers of wisdom and foresight (making the lake roughly analogous to Mimir's well), and the central character casts both his eyes into the lake, which not only means he gains all its powers of knowledge and vision, but also that he will not have to stare down the Beast during his final battle. He rides North, guided by the ravens and by the ancient Gods, to confront his destiny. He charges down the gates of Hel and defeats the Beast in combat, as well as freeing the souls of those that had been held captive here, riding with them to Valhalla.

Track listing

Personnel 
Bathory
 Quorthon – vocals, guitar
 Kothaar – bass guitar
 Vvornth – drums
Art
 Kristian Wåhlin – album cover artwork

References 

Bathory (band) albums
1996 albums
Folk metal albums
Viking metal albums
Concept albums